Dariusz Snarski is a Polish Olympic boxer. He represented his country in the lightweight division at the 1992 Summer Olympics. He won his first bout against Justin Rowsell of Australia, and then lost his second bout to Marco Rudolph of Germany.

References

1968 births
Living people
People from Bielsk Podlaski
Sportspeople from Podlaskie Voivodeship
Polish male boxers
Olympic boxers of Poland
Boxers at the 1992 Summer Olympics
Lightweight boxers